Ust-Urkima is a rural locality (a selo) and the administrative center of Nyukzhinsky Selsoviet of Tyndinsky District, Amur Oblast, Russia. The population was 260 as of 2018. There are 5 streets.

Geography 
Ust-Urkima is located 154 km northwest of Tynda (the district's administrative centre) by road. Larba is the nearest rural locality.

References 

Rural localities in Tyndinsky District